Volume 1: Instrumental Driving Music for Felons is the debut extended play (EP) by American desert rock collective The Desert Sessions. Recorded in August 1997 at Rancho De La Luna, it was released by Man's Ruin Records on November 18, 1997. The album features nine credited musicians, including Josh Homme, John McBain and Ben Shepherd. It was later re-released with Volume 2: Status: Ships Commander Butchered in 1998 as Volumes 1 & 2.

Recording and release
The first two Desert Sessions EPs were recorded in sessions between August 5 and 12, 1997 at Rancho De La Luna in Joshua Tree, California, a studio founded by Fred Drake and Dave Catching. The tracks on Volume 1 were engineered by Drake, with Catching and Tony Mason assisting, and featured a total of nine credited musicians: Josh Homme, John McBain (both guitars and keyboards), Ben Shepherd (bass), Alfredo Hernández, Brant Bjork (both drums), The Reverend Ponce Jones, Pete Stahl (both vocals), Drake (guitars, drums, keyboards) and Catching (bass, piano, guitar). Homme mixed the album, and it was mastered by Tom Baker at Future Disc in Hollywood, Los Angeles, California.

Volume 1 was initially released alone on vinyl by Man's Ruin Records on November 18, 1997. It later received a re-release with its follow-up, Volume 2: Status: Ships Commander Butchered, on CD on February 24, 1998, as Volumes 1 & 2.

Critical reception

Music website AllMusic awarded Volume 1: Instrumental Driving Music for Felons three out of five stars. In a four-star review of Volumes 1 & 2 for the website, Tom Schulte said the following about the albums: "Propelled by a steady rhythm section, guitars or keyboards creep in to contribute mostly spectral wails decaying with tremolo or reverb. The picture you get is very much that of a desert, a wasteland divided by a stark streak of asphalt." He summarised the album as a "soundtrack for a running reckless in a land where the only visible things are the dash panel, the headlights, and the stars".

Track listing
All songs written and composed by "Acquitted Felons".

The two "Girl Boy Tom" tracks are actually part of a single song. "Monkey in the Middle" is crammed between the two tracks with a fade out from "Girl Boy Tom" and fade back into "Girl Boy Tom". Thus the title "Monkey in the Middle" is a sort of play on titles, being the monkey in the middle. Tracks 3, 4 and 5 are unlisted.

Personnel
Personnel credits adapted from album liner notes.
Musicians
Josh Homme – guitars (tracks 2, 6 and 7), keyboards (tracks 1 and 3), mixing
John McBain – guitars (tracks 1, 2 and 3), lap steel guitar (track 2), keyboards (track 6), slide guitar (track 7)
Fred Drake – guitars (tracks 1 and 3), drums (tracks 2 and 6), keyboards (tracks 2 and 6), engineering
Dave Catching – bass (tracks 1 and 3), electronic piano (track 2), guitar (track 6), engineering assistance
Ben Shepherd – bass (tracks 2, 6 and 7)
Alfredo Hernández – drums (tracks 1, 3 and 7)
The Reverend Ponce Jones – vocals (tracks 4 and 5)
Brant Bjork – drums (track 7)
Pete Stahl – vocals (track 7)
Additional personnel
Tony Mason – engineering assistance
Tom Baker – mastering

References

1997 debut EPs
The Desert Sessions albums
Man's Ruin Records EPs